Bomporto is a comune (municipality) in the Province of Modena in the Italian region Emilia-Romagna, located about  northwest of Bologna and about  northeast of Modena. 

Bomporto borders the following municipalities: Bastiglia, Camposanto, Medolla, Modena, Nonantola, Ravarino, San Prospero, Soliera.

The town limits hold the Pieve di Sorbara, a romanesque parish church.

Twin towns
Bomporto is twinned with:

  Mola di Bari, Italy, since 2013

References

External links
 Official website
 www.bomporto.it/

Cities and towns in Emilia-Romagna